The Sindlinger HH-1 Hawker Hurricane is a ⅝ scale homebuilt design based on the Hawker Hurricane. Designed by Fred Sindlinger for amateur construction, the prototype was built between 1969 and 1972.

Design
Although based on the Hawker Hurricane the design makes some compromises for the amateur construction and the smaller size. It is an all-wood low-wing cantilever monoplane with a manual retractable main landing gear and fixed tail wheel. Designed to take a  Lycoming engine. The cockpit is 4 inches (10.2 cm) out of scale in height and width and the elevators are 12% overscale. It used wooden stringers and fabric to give the appearance of the real Hurricane.

Although originally designed for the Lycoming O-320 a number of people have successfully fitted auto (car) engines. The picture is of one such conversion in New Zealand which has been successfully flying for 250 hours as of March 2009 using a Mitsubishi 6G72 V6 engine driving a Dave Blanton designed cogged belt PSRU. This aircraft is also fitted with electric retractable landing gear.

Specifications (Sindlinger prototype)

See also

References

External links

 Philo Lund Collection

1970s United States civil utility aircraft
Homebuilt aircraft
Replica aircraft
Low-wing aircraft
Single-engined tractor aircraft
Aircraft first flown in 1972